The Archive Collection: Volume 1 – IQ20 is a live album by British progressive rock band IQ released in 2003. The album is the first installment of a series of original bootlegs releases, and was recorded on 16 February 2002 at the Colos-Saal, in Aschaffenburg, Germany, during IQ's 20th anniversary tour.

Track listing

Disc one
"Intro" - 3:56
"Awake and Nervous" - 8:32
"The Thousand Days" / "The Magic Roundabout" - 9:18
"The Wrong Side of Weird" - 13:02
"State of Mine" / "Leap of Faith" / "Came Down" - 10:46
"Erosion" - 7:18
"The Seventh House" - 14:56

Disc two
"The Narrow Margin" (Middle section) - 6:05
"Just Changing Hands" - 6:45
"Guiding Light" - 10:28
"The Last Human Gateway" - 22:08
"Subterranea" - 7:43

Personnel
 Peter Nicholls – vocals
 Mike Holmes – electric guitar
 Martin Orford – keyboards
 Jon Jowitt – bass guitar
 Paul Cook – drums

References

Neo-progressive rock albums
IQ (band) albums
2003 live albums